Moop or MOOP may refer to:

 Medal "For Impeccable Service", in the Soviet Armed Forces
 MOOP (electrical safety), a concept found in the standard for medical electrical equipment IEC 60601-1
 A term for negative emotions on the cartoon series Bravest Warriors
 "Matter Out Of Place", a neologism for trash used by Burning Man attendees
 Maximum Out-of-Pocket, a term used in the health insurance marketplace
 A fictional band from the episode "Christian Rock Hard" of South Park

See also
 
 MoOPH, oxodiperoxymolybdenum(pyridine)-(hexamethylphosphoric triamide)